Chamizo is a village in the Florida Department of central Uruguay.

Geography

History
It was declared a "Pueblo" (village) on 21 November 1931 by the Act of Ley Nº 8.796.

Population
In 2011 Chamizo had a population of 540.
 
Source: Instituto Nacional de Estadística de Uruguay

Places of worship
 St. Thérèse of Lisieux Parish Church (Roman Catholic)

References

External links
INE map of Chamizo

Populated places in the Florida Department